Paavo Kalevi ”Häkä” Häkkinen (12 March 1928, in Hankasalmi – 21 March 2017) was a Finnish alpine skier who competed in the 1956 Winter Olympics.

References

1928 births
2017 deaths
People from Hankasalmi
Finnish male alpine skiers
Olympic alpine skiers of Finland
Alpine skiers at the 1956 Winter Olympics
Sportspeople from Central Finland
20th-century Finnish people